Lumpenus lampretaeformis, the snakeblenny, is a species of marine ray-finned fish belonging to the family Stichaeidae, the pricklebacks and shannies.

It is native to the coasts of Northern Atlantic Ocean.

References

Lumpeninae